The Varunastra (Sanskrit वरुणास्त्र) is the water weapon (a storm) according to the Indian scriptures, incepted by Varuna, god of hydrosphere. In stories, it is said to assume any weapon's shape, just like water. Upon usage, it brings large volume of water which washes away large part of infantry. The only counter for this astra is Visoshanastra, which can be obtained by Indra, king of gods. As per the Indian legends or Puranas, this weapon is said to have been obtained by great warrior characters such as Rama, Lakshmana, Hanuman, Ravana, Meghanada, Vishvamitra, Vasishta, Arjuna, Karna, Krishna, Satyaki, Abhimanyu, Pradyumna, Drona, Bhishma and many other illustrious warrior characters. 

The scriptures say this weapon was obtained by meditating on Varuna or Shiva, and was to be used with great care and skill. The usage of weapon was not possible for any inexperienced warrior, as a slight mistake committed, and the user himself could be destroyed. Indian scriptures and epics give large insights about weapons used by proper use of mantras. Weapons were used by chanting of mantras in the manner prescribed.

References

Weapons in Hindu mythology